Phoenicobius aratus is a species of medium-sized, air-breathing land snail, a terrestrial pulmonate gastropod mollusk in the family Bradybaenidae.

This species can be found in the Philippines.

References

Bradybaenidae
Gastropods described in 1841